Fiddler on the Roof is a 1971 American period musical film produced and directed by Norman Jewison from a screenplay written by Joseph Stein, based on the 1964 stage musical of the same name by Stein, Jerry Bock, and Sheldon Harnick. Set in early 20th-century Imperial Russia, the film centers on Tevye, played by Topol, a poor Jewish milkman who is faced with the challenge of marrying off his five daughters amidst the growing tension in his shtetl. The cast also features Norma Crane, Leonard Frey, Molly Picon, Paul Mann, Rosalind Harris, Michèle Marsh, Neva Small and Paul Michael Glaser. The musical score, composed by Bock with lyrics by Harnick, was adapted and conducted by John Williams.

Filmed at Shepperton Studios in England and on-location in Yugoslavia, Fiddler on the Roof was theatrically released on November 3, 1971, by United Artists to critical and commercial success. Reviewers praised Jewison's direction, the screenplay, and the performances of the cast, while the film grossed $83.3 million worldwide on a $9 million budget, becoming the highest-grossing film of 1971. 

The film received a leading eight nominations at the 44th Academy Awards, including for Best Picture and Best Director, and won three: Best Score Adaptation (Williams), Best Cinematography (Oswald Morris) and Best Sound (Gordon K. McCallum, David Hildyard). The film also won two Golden Globes: Best Motion Picture – Musical or Comedy and Best Actor in a Motion Picture – Musical or Comedy for Topol.

Plot
The film's plot largely follows that of the musical from which it is adapted.

Act 1
In 1905, Tevye, a poor Jewish milkman living in the Ukrainian village of Anatevka, a typical shtetl in the Pale of Settlement of Imperial Russia, compares the lives of the Jews of Anatevka to a fiddler on the roof (who appears throughout the film in this metaphorical role), using tradition to “scratch out a pleasant, simple tune” without breaking their necks.

In town, Tevye meets Perchik, a radical Marxist from Kiev, who admonishes those for talking but doing nothing about news of the Tsar banishing Jews from their villages. Tevye invites Perchik to stay with his family, offering him room and board in exchange for him tutoring his daughters.

Tevye arranges for his oldest daughter, Tzeitel, to marry Lazar Wolf, a wealthy widowed butcher much older than she is. Tzeitel loves her childhood sweetheart, the poor tailor Motel Kamzoil, and frantically begs her father not to make her marry Lazar. Although initially angry, Tevye realizes Tzeitel loves Motel and, upon seeing that Motel is equally devoted to Tzeitel, and impressed with his maturity and work ethic (“Your daughter will not starve”) yields to his daughter’s wishes.

To convince his wife Golde that Tzeitel should not marry Lazar, Tevye claims to have had a nightmare. He says that Golde’s deceased grandmother told him Tzeitel is supposed to marry Motel, and that Lazar’s late wife, Fruma-Sarah, threatened to kill Tzeitel if the two marry, along with Tevye and Golde. Golde concludes the dream was a message from their ancestors, and Tzeitel and Motel arrange to be married.

Meanwhile, Tevye’s second daughter, Hodel, falls in love with Perchik. They argue over the story of Leah and the place of old religious traditions in a changing world. The two dance together, which is considered forbidden by Orthodox Jewish tradition. Perchik tells Hodel that they just changed an old tradition.

At Tzeitel and Motel’s wedding, an argument breaks out after Lazar presents the newlyweds with gifts. When Tevye tries to speak to Lazar about the Torah, Lazar refuses to listen, arguing that the wedding should have been his all along. Minutes later, another argument breaks out over whether a girl should be able to choose her own husband. Perchik addresses the crowd and says that, since they love each other, it should be left for the couple to decide. He creates further controversy by asking Hodel to dance with him.

The crowd gradually warms to the idea and Tevye and Golde, then Motel and Tzeitel, join in dancing. The wedding proceeds with great joy. Suddenly, the military presence in the town, along with the constable, arrive and begin a pogrom, the “demonstration” which he had earlier warned Tevye was coming. The constable stops the attack on the wedding celebration after Perchik is wounded in the scuffle with the Tsarist troops; however, he allows the men to continue destroying property in the village. Tevye and the immediate family stand still, until Tevye angrily orders them to clean up instead of standing around. Tevye silently asks why God allowed this to happen to them.

Intermission
In its original theatrical release, the film was shown with an intermission and entr'acte music.

Act 2
Months later, Perchik prepares to leave Anatevka for the revolution. He proposes to Hodel, and she accepts. When they tell Tevye, he is furious that they have decided to marry without his permission, but he again relents because they love each other. Tevye tells Golde his reasons for consenting to their daughter’s marriage, which leads them to re-evaluate their own arranged marriage. Tevye and Golde ultimately realize that, despite having been paired by a matchmaker, and never having met before their wedding, they do love each other.

Weeks later, Perchik is arrested in Kiev and is exiled to Siberia. Hodel decides to join him there. She promises Tevye that she and Perchik will be married under a canopy. Meanwhile, Tzeitel and Motel become parents, and the latter finally buys the sewing machine for which he has long scrimped and saved.

Tevye’s third daughter Chava falls in love with a Russian Orthodox Christian named Fyedka. Tevye tells Chava to be distant friends with Fyedka, because of the difference in their religions. When Chava eventually works up the courage to ask Tevye’s permission to marry Fyedka, Tevye tells her that marrying outside the family’s faith is against tradition. He forbids her to have any contact with Fyedka or even to mention his name. The next morning, Fyedka and Chava elope and are married in a Russian Orthodox church.

In the morning when she notices Chava has disappeared Golde goes to the local church and finds out about the marriage after talking with the priest who officiated it. When a grief-stricken Golde tells Tevye about the marriage, he tells her that Chava is dead to the family and that they shall forget her altogether. Chava asks Tevye to accept her marriage. In a soliloquy, Tevye concludes that he cannot accept Chava marrying a non-Jew. He accuses her of abandoning the Jewish faith and disowns her.

One winter day, the Jews of Anatevka are notified that they have three days to leave the village or be forced out by the government. Tevye, his family and friends begin packing up to leave, heading for various parts of Europe, Israel and the United States.

Yente, the Matchmaker, plans to emigrate to Jerusalem, and says goodbye to Golde with an embrace before departing. Lazar plans to emigrate to Chicago, to live with his former brother-in-law, whom he detests, but “a relative is a relative.” Lazar and Tevye share one last embrace before departing.

Tevye receives letters from Hodel mentioning that she is working hard while Perchik stays in the Siberian prison. It is hoped that when Perchik is released, they will join the others in the United States. Chava and her husband Fyedka come to Tevye’s house and tell the family that they are leaving for Kraków in Galicia, being unable to stay in a place that would force innocent people out. Tevye shows signs of forgiving Chava by murmuring under his breath “And God be with you,” silently urging Tzeitel to repeat his words to Chava. Golde calls out to Chava and Fyedka, telling them they will be living in New York with a relative.

The Constable silently watches as the mass evacuation of Anatevka takes place. The community forms their circle at a crossroad one last time before scattering in different directions. Tevye spots the fiddler and motions to him to come along, symbolizing that even though he must leave his town, his traditions will always be with him.

Cast

Musical numbers 
All songs by Jerry Bock and Sheldon Harnick, arranged by John Williams.

 "Prologue / Tradition" – Tevye and Company
 "Overture"
 "Matchmaker, Matchmaker" – Tzeitel, Hodel, Chava, Shprintze and Bielke 
 "If I Were a Rich Man" – Tevye 
 "Sabbath Prayer" – Tevye, Golde and Chorus
 "To Life" – Tevye, Lazar Wolf, Townsmen and Cossacks 
 "Tevye's Monologue (Tzeitel and Motel)" – Tevye
 "Miracle of Miracles" – Motel
 "Tevye's Dream" – Tevye, Golde, Grandmother Tzeitel, Rabbi, Fruma-Sarah and Ghostly chorus
 "Sunrise, Sunset" – Tevye, Golde, Perchik, Hodel and Guests
 "Wedding Celebration / The Bottle Dance"
 "Entr'acte" – Orchestra
 "Tradition" (Reprise) – Chorus
 "Tevye's Monologue (Hodel and Perchik)" – Tevye
 "Do You Love Me?" – Tevye and Golde
 "Far from the Home I Love" – Hodel
 "Chava Ballet Sequence (Little Bird, Little Chavaleh)" – Tevye
 "Tevye's Monologue (Chava and Fyedka)" – Tevye
 "Anatevka" – Tevye, Golde, Lazar Wolf, Yente, Mendel, Mordcha and Full company
 "Exit Music"

Differences from the Broadway musical 
The film follows the plot of the stage play very closely, retaining nearly all of the play's dialogue, although it omits the songs "Now I Have Everything" and "The Rumor (I Just Heard)". Lyrical portions of "Tevye's Dream (tailor Motel Kamzoil)" were omitted to avoid repetition. The film's soundtrack release notably contained some of these omissions, indicating they were removed from the film during the editing process. These include Golde blessing herself before going back to sleep.

Changes were also made in the song "Tradition", with the film omitting the dialogue between Reb Nachum the beggar (who, in the film, seems unable to speak, at least clearly) and Lazar Wolf as well as dialogue spoken by Yente and Avram. In addition, in the film, two men argue about whether a horse claimed to be six years old was actually twelve, rather than whether the horse was actually a mule. The LP film soundtrack retained their names, Yitzhak and Avram, however this was also omitted in the film's release. Instead, an on-set, improvised take of Topol (saying "he sold him"), rather than the recorded dubbing, was used.

Seven additional scenes were added to the film:
 The Constable gets orders from his superior for a "demonstration" against the Jews (referred to by the superior as "Christ-killers") in Anatevka.
 Perchik is arrested at a workers' rally in Kiev.
 Golde goes to the priest to look for Chava (described by her in the stage production). She is confronted there with Christian images (of historically Jewish individuals) in a juxtaposition with the synagogue montage at the start of the film.
 Motel gets dressed for his upcoming wedding to Tzeitel.
 The rabbi and his students inside the synagogue receive news of the arrival of Motel's new sewing machine.
 The rabbi takes the Torah out of the ark inside the synagogue for the last time. He weeps and chants quietly about having to abandon the synagogue.
 Tevye feeds his animals in the barn for the final time. He tells his lame horse to take care of his leg and to treat his new owner and master well.

The scene with Hodel and Perchik, where he plans to leave to start a revolution, was extended in the film. A new song sung by Perchik was recorded ("Any Day Now"), but was omitted from the final print; however, it was included in the 2004 reissue of the soundtrack. The song was later implemented in the 2018 Yiddish production as a song sung by Perchik to Shprintze and Bielke. When the film was re-released to theaters in 1979, 32 minutes were cut, including the songs "Far from the Home I Love" and "Anatevka".

In the film, Tevye and Lazar Wolf discuss Wolf's proposed marriage to Tzeitel in Wolf's home, then go to the tavern for a celebration drink. In the stage version, the two meet directly in the tavern. The film shows Wolf's home as filled with golden artifacts. Prior to Lazar Wolf entering the scene, Tevye speaks to a female servant, who tells him not to touch anything.

Although a faithful adaptation of the original stage version, Fiddler scholar Jan Lisa Huttner has noted several differences between stage and screen. She argues that changes in American culture and politics and developments in Israel led the filmmakers to portray certain characters differently and to offer a different version of Anatevka. For example, the Broadway production cast Bea Arthur as a tall, booming Yente, while the film portrays Yente as tiny and timid. Huttner also notes that the "Chagall color palette" of the original Broadway production was exchanged for a grittier, more realistic depiction of the village of Anatevka.

Production
Principal photography was done at Pinewood Studios in Buckinghamshire, England. Most of the exterior shots were done in Yugoslavia—specifically in Mala Gorica, Lekenik, and Zagreb within the Yugoslav constituent republic of Croatia. Though the area was under heavy snow during location scouting in 1969, during the filming the producers had to ship in marble dust to stand in for snow. Additional scenes were shot at the Jadran Film studios. 300 extras conversant in various foreign languages were used, as were flocks of geese and pigs and their handlers. Isaac Stern performed the violin solos.

Casting 
The decision to cast Topol, instead of Zero Mostel, as Tevye was a somewhat controversial one, as the role had originated with Mostel and he had made it famous. Years later, Jewison said he felt Mostel's larger-than-life personality, while fine on stage, would cause film audiences to see him as Mostel, rather than the character of Tevye. Before Topol was cast, Orson Welles, Anthony Quinn and Marlon Brando were all considered.

Rosalind Harris, who played Tzeitel, was previously Bette Midler's understudy in the role during the original Broadway production.

Assi Dayan, a well-known Israeli actor and filmmaker, was originally cast as Perchik, but couldn't handle the English dialogue and was replaced by Paul Michael Glaser. Rob Reiner auditioned for the role of Motel. Richard Thomas was Jewison's choice to play Fyedka, but ultimately Italian actor Ray Lovelock was cast in the part. Talia Shire and Katey Sagal both auditioned to play Topol's daughters. 

Norman Jewison has an uncredited voiceover cameo as the Rabbi in the "Tevye's Dream" number.

Fiddler on the Roof was the final film of Norma Crane, who died of breast cancer two years after its release.

Music 
The music for the film was conducted and adapted by John Williams from the original score by Jerry Bock. Williams also composed additional music and an original cadenza for Isaac Stern. The score was orchestrated by Williams and Alexander Courage.

Release

Roadshow presentation
Because the film follows the stage musical so closely, and the musical did not have an overture, the filmmakers chose to eliminate the customary film overture played before the beginning of most motion pictures shown in a roadshow-style presentation. However, there is a solo by the Fiddler played over the opening credits (after the conclusion of "Tradition"), an intermission featuring entr'acte music, and exit music played at the end after the closing credits.

Reception
The film was a success, earning United Artists profits of $6.1 million, plus distribution profits of $8 million.

On review aggregator website Rotten Tomatoes, the film holds an 83% rating based on 41 reviews, with an average of 7.80/10. The consensus summarizes: "A bird may love a fish - and musical fans will love this adaptation of Fiddler on the Roof, even if it is not quite as transcendent as the long-running stage version."

Roger Ebert thought the storyline of the musical was "quite simply boring", but still gave the screen version three stars out of four, explaining that Jewison "has made as good a film as can be made" from the material. Gene Siskel awarded three-and-a-half stars out of four, writing that the musical numbers were "better staged and choreographed than in any recent Broadway film adaptation". Vincent Canby of The New York Times thought the film version was inferior, explaining that by "literalizing" the show with real landscapes and houses, Jewison and Stein "have effectively overwhelmed not only Aleichem, but the best things about the stage production ... pushed beyond its limits, the music goes flat and renders banal moments that, on the stage, are immensely moving." Charles Champlin of the Los Angeles Times wrote that the film "has been done not only with such artistry, but also with such evident love, devotion, integrity and high aspiration that watching it is a kind of duplex pleasure." Gary Arnold of The Washington Post stated, "Jewison's Fiddler is a great film, by which I mean great in the sense that matters most – greatly moving, an extraordinarily powerful, emotional experience." Pauline Kael of The New Yorker called it "an absolutely smashing movie; it is not especially sensitive, it is far from delicate, and it isn't even particularly imaginative, but it seems to me the most powerful movie musical ever made."

Awards and nominations

American Film Institute recognition
 AFI's 100 Years...100 Movies - Nominated
 AFI's 100 Years...100 Songs: 
 "Sunrise, Sunset" - Nominated
 "If I Were a Rich Man" - Nominated
 AFI's 100 Years...100 Cheers - #82
 AFI's Greatest Movie Musicals - Nominated

Soundtrack 
A 2-LP soundtrack album was issued by United Artists Records in 1971. A cassette release shortly followed which featured two instrumental tracks not on the original LP release: "Entr'acte" and "The Pogrom" (tracked as "First Act Finale" on later CD releases).

In 2001, EMI Records released a remastered soundtrack CD to commemorate the film's 30th anniversary. This was the first time the "First Act Finale" and "Entr'acte" were featured on CD. This release also included the previously unreleased "Wedding Procession" track. It also featured the demo of "Any Day Now", a song that was cut from the final film.

On December 7, 2021, La-La Land Records released a 3-disc limited edition soundtrack which featured alternate versions of songs, as well as unreleased instrumental score composed by Williams.

In February 2022, the University of Michigan School of Music, Theatre, & Dance presented a concert version of Fiddler using the arrangements written by John Williams for the film. Broadway performers Chuck Cooper and Loretta Ables Sayre played the roles of Tevye and Golde with The Grand Rapids Symphony as the backing orchestra. The event was the first live performance of Williams' orchestrations for the film.

Remake
On May 28, 2020, it was announced that Metro-Goldwyn-Mayer and producers Dan Jinks and Aaron Harnick will oversee a remake, with Thomas Kail (known for his work on Hamilton and Grease Live!) directing and co-producing, and Dear Evan Hansen librettist Steven Levenson penning the screenplay.

See also
 List of American films of 1971

Notes

References

Sources

Further reading

External links

 
 
 
 
 
 

1971 comedy films
1971 drama films
1971 films
1970s English-language films
1970s musical comedy-drama films
1970s American films
American interfaith romance films
American musical comedy-drama films
Best Musical or Comedy Picture Golden Globe winners
Films about father–daughter relationships
Fiddler on the Roof
Films about race and ethnicity
Films about Orthodox and Hasidic Jews
Films about pogroms
Films about the 1905 Russian Revolution
Films based on adaptations
Films based on musicals
Films directed by Norman Jewison
Films featuring a Best Musical or Comedy Actor Golden Globe winning performance
Films scored by John Williams
Films set in 1905
Films set in the Russian Empire
Films set in Ukraine
Films shot at Pinewood Studios
Films shot in Croatia
Films shot in England
Films shot in London
Films shot in Yugoslavia
Films that won the Best Original Score Academy Award
Films that won the Best Sound Mixing Academy Award
Films whose cinematographer won the Best Cinematography Academy Award
Hebrew-language films
1970s Russian-language films
United Artists films
pt:Fiddler on the Roof